Juho Takala (6 February 1902, in Ylihärmä – 18 June 1982) was a Finnish schoolteacher and politician. He was a member of the Parliament of Finland from 1933 to 1939 and again from 1940 to 1945, representing the Agrarian League. He was later active in the People's Party of Finland.

References

1902 births
1982 deaths
People from Ylihärmä
People from Vaasa Province (Grand Duchy of Finland)
Centre Party (Finland) politicians
People's Party of Finland (1951) politicians
Members of the Parliament of Finland (1933–36)
Members of the Parliament of Finland (1936–39)
Members of the Parliament of Finland (1939–45)
Finnish schoolteachers
Finnish people of World War II